Samir Bourouina (born August 1, 1978 in Mulhouse) is a French professional football player of Algerian origin. Currently, he plays in the Championnat de France amateur for FC Mulhouse.

He played on the professional level in Ligue 2 for FC Mulhouse.

1978 births
Living people
French footballers
Ligue 2 players
FC Mulhouse players
French sportspeople of Algerian descent
Footballers from Mulhouse
Pau FC players
SR Colmar players
AS Illzach Modenheim players
Association football midfielders
UF Mâconnais players